Khan's Mosque in Kasimov is the oldest mosque in Central Russia. It dates from the Qasim Khanate of the 15th and 16th centuries. According to Kadir Ali, the brick mosque was built by Shahghali at some point in the mid-16th century. Others believe that the mosque goes back to the reign of Qasim Khan. The original building was torn down at the behest of Peter the Great in 1702, but its wide stone minaret survives.

The existing mosque was erected next to the old minaret in 1768. The local Tatar nobles had a second storey added in 1835. A little closer to the Oka River is another local landmark, Shahghali's Mausoleum from the mid-16th century. The Khan's Mosque has been designated a public museum since the 1930s.

The minimalist design of the minaret, with its unadorned walls, reminds of that of the famous Guangta Minaret of Huaisheng Mosque in Guangzhou, in South China.

See also
Islam in Russia
List of mosques in Russia
List of mosques in Europe

References

External links
 Guide to Russia: Kasimov

Buildings and structures in Ryazan Oblast
Mosques in Russia
Museums in Ryazan Oblast
Local museums in Russia
Destroyed mosques
Closed mosques in the Soviet Union
1768 establishments in the Russian Empire
Mosque buildings with domes
Religious buildings and structures completed in 1768
Mosques in Europe
Objects of cultural heritage of Russia of federal significance
Cultural heritage monuments in Ryazan Oblast